Streets Ahead Rwanda is a UK based charity established in October 2003 to help street children living in Eastern Rwanda who continue to suffer the effects of the Rwandan genocide.

Children's Centre in Rwanda
The charity works in partnership with the Streets Ahead Children's Centre which is an NGO based in Rwanda. The centre is based in Kayonza but reintegrates children across the entire country.

See also 
Streets Ahead Website
SACCA Rwanda Website

References

2003 establishments in the United Kingdom
Children's charities based in the United Kingdom
Foreign charities operating in Rwanda
Rwandan genocide
Organizations established in 2003